Schizothorax ramzani is a species of ray-finned fish in the genus Schizothorax found in the Indus River in Pakistan.

References 

Schizothorax
Fish described in 2012